Timothy Charles Whitnall (born 27 June 1961) is an English actor, playwright and screenwriter. He is known for playing Angelo in the long-running CITV series Mike and Angelo and narrating the BBC children's TV programme Teletubbies from 1997 to 2001. As a writer, he has won a BAFTA and an Olivier Award for his work on TV movie Best Possible Taste: The Kenny Everett Story and play Morecambe.
He is also a voice actor, providing voices on television shows such as Fifi and the Flowertots, Roary the Racing Car and Thomas & Friends.

Career
Whitnall began his career in West End musical Elvis in 1977 after winning the role in an open call audition. has starred in many West End musicals including Grease, The Rocky Horror Show, and Good Rockin' Tonight.

After making TV appearances for the musicals he was involved in, he began a career in television - presenting (and writing for) the BBC Schools series, "The Music Arcade" (with Lucie Skeaping), "Music Time", "Time and Tune", "Music Workshop", and "Let's Sing". He also began making appearances as an actor, playing Jake in ITV children's drama The All Electric Amusement Arcade and Paul in Play for Today episode Not for the Likes of Us.

Whitnall is also known for providing many voice-overs and vocals for TV commercials, animations, and jingles.  From the late 1980s to the channel's demise in 2000, he was an announcer on The Children's Channel, also providing the voice to the station's early 1990s mascot Link Anchorman. He was also the voice for Woolworths mascot Keith the Alien in 1998.

In 1990, he succeeded Tyler Butterworth in the role of alien Angelo in Children's sci-fi sitcom Mike and Angelo. He portrayed the character for ten series, until the show's end in 2000.

Whitnall's theatre play The Sociable Plover, first performed at Old Red Lion Theatre in 2005, was made into a feature film by Poisson Rouge Pictures and Solution Films (re-titled as The Hide) and received its UK première on Film4 in February 2009. Following its screen release at the ICA Cinema, London, the film was released on DVD in January 2010. For this work, Whitnall was nominated for Best First Feature Length Screenplay category in the 2010 Writer's Guild of Great Britain Awards.

Whitnall's next play Morecambe – a tribute to the late comedian Eric Morecambe – won a Fringe First Award for 'innovation and excellence in new writing' at the 2009 Edinburgh Festival Fringe. The show opened at London's Duchess Theatre the following December and toured the UK through 2010. The piece was nominated in two separate categories in the 2010 Laurence Olivier Awards and won the 'Best Entertainment' category.

In 2012, BBC Four screened Whitnall's 90-minute drama Best Possible Taste: The Kenny Everett Story, which examined and celebrated the life of Kenny Everett. It was directed by James Strong, produced by Paul Frift and starred Oliver Lansley and Katherine Kelly. For it, Whitnall won the Breakthrough Talent Award in the 2013 BAFTA Television Craft Awards.

During 2014, Whitnall joined the cast of the CGI version of the British TV series Thomas & Friends, providing the voices of the characters Timothy, Reg, Mike, Jerome, Oliver the Excavator and the UK version of Max.

Personal life
Whitnall lives in Richmond, London with his partner, Anna Murphy, with whom he has a production company, Feather Productions Ltd.

Filmography

Actor

Television

Stage

Film

Video games

Screenwriter

Film

Television

Stage

Discography
Elvis - The Original Cast Albums (1978)
20 Years On 77-97 (with Darrel Higham & The Enforcers)(1997)
Even Warren Beatty (with Matthew Strachan) (2002)

Awards and nominations

References

External links

Tim Whitnall on Discogs

1961 births
Living people
20th-century English male actors
21st-century English male actors
English dramatists and playwrights
English male dramatists and playwrights
English male screenwriters
English male stage actors
English male television actors
English male voice actors
English screenwriters
Male actors from Essex
People from Canvey Island